Stoycho Panchev Valchev (Stoĭcho Panchev) (6 March 1933 – 31 August 2014) was a Bulgarian meteorologist and fluid dynamicist, and a professor of Sofia University. His book on turbulence is used as the standard text in the field of turbulence.

Biography
Stoycho Panchev was born in Lisec in Lovech. He obtained his bachelor's degree from Sofia University and completed PhD at Bulgarian Academy of Sciences. He was also a visiting professor of Colorado State University.

Books

References

1933 births
2014 deaths
Bulgarian physicists
Fluid dynamicists
Sofia University alumni
Academic staff of Sofia University